The tax regime for non-habitual residents (commonly known as NHRs or NHR Tax Regime), formally known as non-regular residents, was created with the approval of the Investment Tax Code, approved by Decree-Law n. 249/2009, of 23 September. It change the rules of the Portuguese Personal Income Tax, by granting a set of tax exemptions and flat rate taxation for a period of 10 years, in order to attract to Portugal, expat professionals qualified in activities with high added value or intellectual, industrial or know-how, as well as pensioners and other passive income earners.

Tax benefits 
Under the initial rules set in the NHR regime the following tax rates applied, in Portugal, to the income of those duly enrolled in it:

Critics and reform 
The above rules allowed for the double non-taxation on pensions, specially for those sourced in Scandinavian countries, such as Finland and Sweden, and in France. This situation lead to Finland and Sweden to revoke their taxation agreements with Portugal.

With the approval of the 2020 State Budget Law, by the Assembly of the Republic, the Portuguese Government addressed the vocal critics of other EU-Member States by implementing changes to the regime, namely regarding pension income.

High Added Value-Activities

Requirements 
Under the Investment Tax Code rules, the regime is available to anyone who fulfilling the following conditions:

 Be deemed resident on Portuguese territory for tax purposes, according to any of the following criteria in the year to be taxed as a non-habitual resident:
 Living more than 183, consecutive or not, days in Portugal in any period of 12 months starting or ending in the relevant year;
 When living in Portugal for an inferior period, having, in any day of the 12 months threshold, a house in such conditions that allow to presume the intention to hold and occupy it as his habitual place of residence;
 Is a crew member of a ship or aircraft on December 31, provided he is in the service of entities with residence, headquarters or effective direction in Portugal;
 Performs abroad functions or commissions of a public nature, at the service of the Portuguese State.
 To have not been deemed resident on Portuguese territory during the five years prior to the year pretended to be taxed as a non-regular resident.

Upon application, the Portuguese Tax and Customs Authority might request proof of tax residency abroad, such as tax residency certificates, tax returns and tax settlement notices.

Statistics 
Among the 27.367 beneficiaries, according to 2019 numbers, just over two thousand (8%) develop professions with high-added value, while the remaining were expat pensioners. The most common nationalities among pensioners were French, Italian, and Swedish.

References 

Income taxes
Taxation in Portugal